Milagrosa Tee Tan (24 February 1958 – 30 November 2019) was a Filipina politician from the province of Samar in the Philippines. She was from the town of Palompon in the province of Leyte and married a Catbaloganon. She was the first female governor of the province who served from 2001 to 2010 and was re-elected in 2019 following the end of term of her daughter, Sharee Ann Tan. She also served as a member of the House of Representatives of the Philippines.

Suspension as governor
On 23 November 2018, the Sandiganbayan anti-graft court directed the offices of House Speaker Gloria Macapagal Arroyo and Interior and Local Government Secretary Eduardo Año to implement a 90-day preventive suspension of Samar Representative Milagrosa Tan. The anomalous transactions involved the purchase of  worth of medicines,  worth of electric fans, and  worth of assorted goods and rice. Tan was convicted on 1 March 2019 and was thus disqualified from holding public office.

Personal life and death
Mila Tan was married to Ricardo Tan, and had four children together: Sharee Ann, Angelie, Stephen James, and Reynolds Michael.

She died at a hospital in Taguig after going into cardiac arrest on 30 November 2019.

Electoral history

References

External links
Province of Samar

1958 births
2019 deaths
21st-century Filipino women politicians
21st-century Filipino politicians
Governors of Samar (province)
Members of the House of Representatives of the Philippines from Samar (province)
PDP–Laban politicians
Politicians from Samar (province)
Women members of the House of Representatives of the Philippines